Stenson Fields is a semi-rural suburban housing development and civil parish in the South Derbyshire district of Derbyshire, England. The parish is contiguous with Sinfin, a southern area of Derby, but is outside the city boundary. The housing in the area largely dates from the 1970s onwards. 

The parish was created in 1983 from parts of the neighbouring Barrow upon Trent and Twyford and Stenson parishes. Together with Twyford and Stenson, Stenson Fields is part of South Derbyshire district's Stenson electoral ward. Stenson Fields was formally in the Ticknall ward, which stretched from the Derby City boundary to the Leicestershire County line. 

There is one school in the parish, Stenson Fields Primary Community School, although a further two schools are planned, one primary and one secondary. There is presently one place of worship, Stenson Fields Christian Fellowship, which is an independent evangelical church. There is a parade of shops and the Stenson Fields public house on Pilgrims Way, opposite the church. Several other amenities, including an Asda supermarket, are located just outside the parish boundary at the Sinfin District Centre.

References

Civil parishes in Derbyshire
South Derbyshire District